The 2016–17 season was Sunderland's 138th season in existence, and their tenth consecutive season in the Premier League. Along with competing in the Premier League, the club also participated in the FA Cup and EFL Cup. The season covered the period from 1 July 2016 to 30 June 2017.

The club was relegated to the second tier for the first time in ten years at the end of the season, finishing bottom of the table with 24 points.

First team squad

Transfers and loans

New contracts

Transfers in

Loans in

Transfers out

Loans out

Pre-season friendlies
On 3 June 2016, Sunderland announced two pre-season friendlies against Hartlepool United and Rotherham United.

Competitions

Premier League

League table

Results summary

Results by matchday

Matches

FA Cup

EFL Cup

Statistics

Overview

Top scorers
The list is sorted by shirt number when total goals are equal.
Last updated on 4 February 2017.

Clean sheets 
Includes all competitive matches. The list is sorted alphabetically by surname when total clean sheets are equal.

Correct as of match played on 26 February 2017

Disciplinary record

References

Sunderland
Sunderland A.F.C. seasons